Lim Hwa-young (born October 6, 1984) is a South Korean actress.

Filmography

Film

Television series

Music videos appearances

Awards and nominations

References

1984 births
Living people
21st-century South Korean actresses
People from Seoul
South Korean film actresses
South Korean television actresses
Seoul Institute of the Arts alumni